Michael Spencer "Mike" Lynch is a state representative from Wellington, Colorado. A Republican, Lynch represents Colorado House of Representatives District 65, which includes parts of Weld and Larimer counties, including the communities of Windsor, Wellington, Severance, Tinmath, and Eaton. Prior to 2020 reapportionment, he represented District 49, which included portions of Larimer and Weld counties in northern Colorado.

Background
At the time of his election to the Colorado House of Representatives, Lynch served as the president of The Western Heritage Company. Previously, he worked in leadership positions in SHL-Aspen Tree Software and Stryker Corporation. He serves on numerous boards, including the Larimer County Rural Land Use Board and the Project Smile Board of Directors.

Prior to his election to the Colorado State House in 2020, Lynch ran unsuccessfully for the Colorado State Senate in 2009.

Lynch holds a Bachelor of Science degree from the United States Military Academy at West Point (1993) and a Master of Science in public administration from the University of Colorado Boulder (1999).

Elections

2020
Lynch was first elected to the Colorado House of Representatives in the 2020 general election.
In the June 2020 primary election, he defeated Republican State Senator Vicki Marble, winning 67.02% of the total votes cast.

In the 2020 general election, Lynch defeated his Democratic Party opponent, winning 61.05% of the total votes cast.

2022
In the 2020 reapportionment process, Lynch's residence in Wellington moved from house District 49 to house district 65. District 65 includes parts of Weld and Larimer counties, including the communities of Windsor, Wellington, Severance, Tinmath, and Eaton. So when the Colorado General Assembly convened on January 9, 2023, Lynch finished his term in the former district 49 and began his term in the new district 65.

In the 2022 election, Lynch defeated his Democratic Party opponent, winning 62.41% of the total votes cast.

After the 2022 general election, Lynch was selected to become the next minority leader of the House for the 2023 legislative session.

References

External links
Legislative website
Campaign website

21st-century American politicians
American business executives
Living people
Military personnel from Colorado
People from Larimer County, Colorado
Republican Party members of the Colorado House of Representatives
United States Army officers
United States Military Academy alumni
University of Colorado Boulder alumni
Year of birth missing (living people)